The 1878 Carmarthen Boroughs by-election was a parliamentary by-election held for the House of Commons constituency of Carmarthen Boroughs in West Wales on 11 May 1878.

Vacancy
The by-election was caused by the resignation of the sitting Liberal MP, Sir Arthur Cowell-Stepney, 2nd Baronet.

Candidates
The Liberals selected Benjamin Thomas Williams, QC, a successful barrister and a former Recorder of Carmarthen.

The result
There being no other candidates putting themselves forward Williams was returned unopposed.

See also
Lists of United Kingdom by-elections 
United Kingdom by-election records
Carmarthen by-election

References

1878 elections in the United Kingdom
1878 in Wales
1870s elections in Wales
By-elections to the Parliament of the United Kingdom in Welsh constituencies
Unopposed by-elections to the Parliament of the United Kingdom in Welsh constituencies
Elections in Carmarthenshire
19th century in Carmarthenshire
May 1878 events